Zerzan is a Bohemian surname. Notable people with the surname include: 

 Andrew Zerzan, UN and World Bank official
 Greg Zerzan, U.S. government official
 John Zerzan, primitivist philosopher

References
 History of the State of Nebraska by A. T. Andreas (1882), Colfax County, Part 4 (cond.) Schuylar: Biographical Sketches
 Czechs in Nebraska
 HISTORY OF CZECHS (BOHEMIANS) IN NEBRASKA by Rose Rosicky, printed Omaha 1929, pages 52, 61, 152-154, 176-177, 199, 203, 349, 415. 457

Czech-language surnames